S2C may refer to:

 S2C reactor, US nuclear reactor design
 Spelling to Communicate, discredited communication technique in disabled care
 S2CID, academic paper identifier

See also
 SC2 (disambiguation)
 SSC (disambiguation)